Under Western Skies may refer to:
 Under Western Skies (1945 film), an American musical western film
 Under Western Skies (1926 film), an American silent western film
 Under Western Skies (album), a 1941 Bing Crosby album